Vruwink may refer to:

Amy Sue Vruwink (born 1975), American politician
Don Vruwink, American educator and politician
Vruwink MotorCycles, Dutch Sidecarcross frame manufacturing company